The Eerie Midnight Horror Show (/ The Exorcism; also known as Enter the Devil, The Sexorcist and The Devil Obsession) is a 1974 Italian horror film Exorcist clone directed by Mario Gariazzo, and starring Stella Carnacina and Chris Avram. Ivan Rassimov played Satan in the film.  A hardcoreversion called Sexorcist Devil was also released.

Plot 
Danila, an art student in Italy, visits an abandoned, deconsecrated church to view life-size wooden sculptures of the crucifixion uncovered there. Along with her art professor, Danila purchases one of the sculptures and brings it to the campus art studio. That night, Danila attends a house party held by her parents, where she witnesses her mother engaging in sadomasochistic sex in one of the bedrooms with Mario, her lover. Disturbed by what she has witnessed, Danila returns to the art studio to work. While painting, she has a vision of the statue of the man coming to life and seducing her.

After, Danila meets her boyfriend, Carlo, for dinner. Upon returning home, she is accosted by something unseen in the stairwell. Upon entering her apartment, she begins masturbating furiously. Her parents later find her in bed, writhing and scratching herself violently. She attempts to initiate sex with her father, after which he slaps her in the face. After being sedated, Danila dreams of driving with her parents into the countryside, during which their car has a tire blowout near an abandoned cathedral. As her father repairs the tire, Danila wanders into the cathedral, where an artist is performing restorations. Danila wanders into catacombs, where she has a vision of three women sacrificing another for the man she earlier witnessed manifest from the statue; the cultists address the man as Satan. Danila drinks from a cup offered to her, before the man crucifies her.

Danila awakens from the dream, violently screaming. Her parents summon a doctor, who finds stigmata on Danila's hands; however, the wounds miraculously disappear the next day. After a priest determines Danila may be possessed, she is taken to a remote Catholic convent in the mountains to undergo an exorcism. When the nuns recite Latin prayer in the chapel, Danila goes mad and flees, but is stopped in town. Sequestered in the mothers superior's quarters, Danila is approached by Father Xeno, a priest, and she attempts to seduce and fellate him. In his room, Father Xeno flagellates himself as penance.

In a second attempt to exorcise Danila, Father Xeno is attacked by her with a chain, which she repeatedly whips him with. She begins to violently foam at the mouth upon seeing his crucifix. Father Xeno ultimately dies during the exorcism, but Danila is saved.

Cast  
Stella Carnacina as Danila  
Chris Avram as Mario
Lucretia Love  as Luisa
Ivan Rassimov as Satan
Gabriele Tinti as Luisa's lover
Luigi Pistilli as Father Xeno
 Gianrico Tondinelli as Carlo
Umberto Raho as Psychiatrist
Piero Gerlini as Rev. Antonio 
Giuseppe Addobbati as Doctor

References

External links

1974 horror films
1974 films
Italian supernatural horror films
Films directed by Mario Gariazzo
Demons in film
Films about exorcism
Religious horror films
Films scored by Marcello Giombini
1970s Italian films